Bulbophyllum hamadryas is a species of orchid in the genus Bulbophyllum.

Var.
Bulbophyllum hamadryas var. hamadryas
Bulbophyllum hamadryas var. orientale Schltr.

References
The Bulbophyllum-Checklist
The Internet Orchid Species Photo Encyclopedia

hamadryas